Snow White is a 1987 American musical fantasy film based on the classic 1812 fairytale and released as part of the "Cannon Movie Tales" series. The film was released straight to video. In August 2005 it was released on Region 1 DVD by MGM.

Plot
The film opens with a handsome young prince traveling through the forest in winter with his men. In a forest glen, the prince finds Snow White lying in a glass coffin. The seven dwarfs arrive and tell the Prince of Snow White's story through flashback.

A courageous King and his fair Queen rule their kingdom well. One winter's day while sewing with her maids, the Queen accidentally pricks her finger with her needle, and a single drop of blood falls on the snow outside her windowsill. The King declares they will have a child with hair as black as ebony, cheeks as red as blood, and skin as white as snow. The Good Queen eventually gives birth to a daughter, whom she names Snow White, but dies shortly after her child is born.

Some years later, the king marries again. However, the new queen (Diana Rigg) is evil and vain and jealous of Snow White (Nicola Stapleton). When her magic mirror tells her that Snow White is now the fairest in the land, the Evil Queen orders a huntsman (Amnon Meskin) to take Snow White into the forest and kill her, and to bring back her liver as proof of her death. During a hunting trip, the huntsman succeeds in taking Snow White away from her father, but Snow White, realizing her stepmother's plan to destroy her, manages to escape into the forest where she finds a cottage belonging to seven kindly dwarves - Iddy, Biddy, Kiddy, Diddy, Fiddy, Giddy and Liddy - who allow her to stay with them. The King is heartbroken when he is told that Snow White had been eaten by wild animals, and later he is killed in battle.

Years later, Snow White (Sarah Patterson) grows into a beautiful young maiden. When the Evil Queen asks the magic mirror "who is the fairest one of all", she learns that Snow White is still alive. The Evil Queen attempts to kill Snow White three times. First, she disguises herself as a gypsy woman and laces up Snow White in a tight bodice, only for the dwarves to cut the lace with scissors. The second time, she disguises herself as a Japanese geisha selling combs and gives Snow White a comb poisoned with an oriental potion.  Finding her collapsed on the floor, the dwarves remove the comb from her hair and destroy it. Finally, the Evil Queen disguises herself as an old peddler woman and offers Snow White a poisoned apple. Snow White resists at first, but relents when the Evil Queen cuts the apple in half so they may share it. Snow White eats the poisoned half of the apple and collapses. The dwarves are unable to revive her, and place her inside a glass coffin.

The film returns to the present, where the dwarves allow the Prince to take Snow White to a proper resting place. When Snow White is being transported, the coffin accidentally falls off the wagon due to a tree falling down by a snowstorm, causing the piece of poisoned apple to dislodge from Snow White's throat, and she awakens. The Prince is enchanted that Snow White magically revived herself and asks her to marry him, and she accepts.

Invitations to the wedding are sent throughout the land, and the Evil Queen receives one as well, leaving the magic mirror into concluding that the Prince's bride is the fairest in the land. Enraged, the Evil Queen smashes her mirror, which causes her to age rapidly. She rushes to the church in time to see that the bride is Snow White, and then disintegrates into ashes before heading back to the carriage. Snow White and the Prince are married and live happily ever after.

Cast
 Diana Rigg as The Evil Queen, Snow White's evil stepmother
 Sarah Patterson as Snow White
 Nicola Stapleton as Young Snow White
 Billy Barty as Iddy
 Mike Edmonds as Biddy 
 Ricardo Gil as Kiddy 
 Malcolm Dixon as Diddy 
 Gary Friedkin as Fiddy 
 Arturo Gil as Giddy 
 Tony Cooper as Liddy 
 Doug Sheldon as The King, Snow White's father
 James Ian Wright as The Prince
 Dorit Adi as the First and Good Queen, Snow White's mother
 Julian Chagrin as the Magic Mirror
 Amnon Meskin as the Huntsman
 Azara Rapoport as the other King, the Prince's father

References

External links
 
 
 

1987 films
1987 direct-to-video films
1987 fantasy films
1980s musical films
American musical fantasy films
Films about royalty
Films based on Snow White
Films about witchcraft
Golan-Globus films
Films produced by Menahem Golan
Cannon Movie Tales
Films produced by Yoram Globus
1980s English-language films
1980s American films
Films about dwarfs